A model spectrum is an artificial spectrum of a star made by recreating the absorption or emission features seen in the spectrum. A model spectrum will usually be of a specific spectral type of star. It may include other properties of the star, such as a surrounding nebula, presence or lack of an extended atmosphere, or a circumstellar dust disc.

References

External links 
 SVO
 Spectral Models Stars and Galaxies
 Castelli-Kurucz Atlas
 Kurucz Models
 Miles Spectral Models

Stellar astronomy